This is a comprehensive list of songs by British rock band Grand Theft Audio. Since forming in 1997, by the name of The Infidels, the band have released only one studio album. After reforming in 2020, the band have spawned three singles and one further studio album.

Original songs

References

Grand Theft Audio